George Washington "Tuffy" Conn (February 22, 1892 – August 2, 1973) was a professional American football player who played in 1920 for the Cleveland Tigers and the Akron Pros of the American Professional Football Association (renamed the National Football League in 1922). Conn won the first AFPA-NFL title that season with the Pros.

College years
Before playing professional football, Conn played college football at Oregon Agricultural College (now called Oregon State University). In 1916, under coach E. J. Stewart, Conn ran for a record 103 yard touchdown off of a fumble recovery. Conn left the Aggies after his freshman year and transferred to Penn. There he continued to play football for the Quakers.

World War I
During World War I, Conn was stationed at Camp Crane in Allentown, Pennsylvania to train as part of the U.S. Army Ambulance Corps (USAAC) before deploying to France. While in Pennsylvania, he played on the "Usaacs" football team with future notable professional players Brooke Brewer and Carl Beck.

Coach
Conn was also the coach of the 1920 football squad at John Carroll University. During his one season with the college, the team compiled a 4–2 record.

Post football
Conn later moved to Pasadena, California and became a successful real estate agent and a member of the prestigious Pasadena Athletic Club.

Head coaching record

References

1890s births
1973 deaths
American football halfbacks
Akron Pros players
Cleveland Tigers (NFL) players
John Carroll Blue Streaks football coaches
Oregon State Beavers football players
Penn Quakers football players
United States Army personnel of World War I
People from Hebron, Illinois
Sportspeople from Pasadena, California
Players of American football from Pasadena, California